Consuming Passions is a 1988 black comedy film which stars Vanessa Redgrave, Jonathan Pryce, and Sammi Davis and was directed by Giles Foster.

Synopsis
The film is based on Secrets by Michael Palin and Terry Jones a BBC television play broadcast in 1973. It tells the story of a chocolate factory preparing to launch a new luxury range, Passionelles. However, during the production run a worker falls into a vat of chocolate and dies, meaning human flesh is present in the first batch released. The horrified owners try and fail to recall the chocolates, but when they go on sale, they prove a surprise hit. Keen to continue the success, the developers try to replicate the taste with animal meat, but this fails miserably - leading them to realise human flesh is the key ingredient, and going to extreme lengths to obtain dead bodies to use in the chocolate.

The Time Out Film Guide describes the 'recipe' for this film and concludes that of the result: "the consistency should be lumpy and the taste insipid."

Cast
 Tyler Butterworth as Ian Littleton  
 Jonathan Pryce as Mr Farris  
 Freddie Jones as Graham Chumley  
 Vanessa Redgrave as Mrs Garza  
 Prunella Scales as Ethel  
 Sammi Davis as Felicity  
 Thora Hird as Mrs Gordon  
 John Wells as Dr Forrester  
 Timothy West as Dr Rees  
 Bryan Pringle as Gateman  
 Mary Healey as Mrs Eggleston  
 Andrew Sachs as Jason  
 Deddie Davies as Mrs Coot  
 William Rushton as Big Teddy  
 Wincey Willis as TV Presenter
 Linda Lusardi as French Beauty
 Patrick Newell as Lester
 Preston Lockwood as Josiah

References

External links
 
 

1988 films
British black comedy films
British independent films
Films shot at Pinewood Studios
1980s black comedy films
Films about cannibalism
1988 comedy films
Films directed by Giles Foster
1980s English-language films
1980s British films